The 1st Infantry Division, Philippine Army, nicknamed Tabak Division, is the Philippine Army's primary infantry unit, and specializes in anti-guerrilla warfare. The division has been involved in combating terrorists in Southern Mindanao.

History

World War II

1st Regular Division, Philippine Army during the Japanese Invasion
The establishment of the 1st Regular Division, Philippine Army was on 5 May 1936 to 9 April 1942 and stationed at Camp Murphy (now Camp Aguinaldo) in Quezon City, Rizal (now Metro Manila). The unit engaged in military operations in the Battle of Bataan from 1 – 9 January 9 April 1942 supporting the USAFFE military forces led by General Douglas MacArthur against the Imperial Japanese troops led by General Masaharu Homma.

When the Battle of Bataan began in January 1942, the local troops of the PCA 1st Regular Division led by Brigadier General Mateo C. Capinpin (1938–1941) and Brigadier General Fidel V. Segundo (1941–1942) was sent to Bataan to augment the USAFFE forces against the Japanese. The battle lasted until April 1942. Before the fall of Bataan, Filipino troops and officers of the 1st Regular Division fought side by side with the USAFFE in Bataan, attacking Japanese troops along the Layac Line, Porac-Guagua Line, Abucay-Mauban Line, Battle of Trail 2, the Battle of the Pockets and the Battle of the Points before the invasion at Mount Samat on 3 April 1942. After the Battle of Bataan on 9 April 1942, the local forces under the PCA 1st Regular Division surrendered to the Japanese Imperial troops. The now infamous Death March commenced the following day with more than 78,000 Filipino and American POWs from Mariveles, Bataan to San Fernando, Pampanga and by train to Camp O'Donnell in Capas, Tarlac.

After the Fall of Bataan on 1942 by the surrendering troopers of the 1st Regular Division by the Japanese hands in Bataan.

The 1st Infantry (TABAK) Division traces its beginning from the first regular Division of the Philippine Commonwealth Army during the commonwealth period. It was activated on 18 January 1936 with Brigadier General Guillermo B. Francisco as its first Commanding General, initially it was filled up by regular troops from the Philippine Constabulary.  It was strengthened in 1941 when World War II loomed in the Pacific region.

Post-World War II

The Division was formally reactivated just in time for the PA's final offensives in the Central Luzon region against the HMB on 1 March 1956.

The Division's BCTs served under the United Nations Command during the Korean War, and the reconstituted division trained AFP elements which composed the PHILCAG sent to Vietnam. It also played a vital role in the anti-insurgency campaign, in the Central Luzon and Cagayan Valley in the 1960s.

It was first deployed in Sulu, Basilan and Tawi-Tawi during the outbreak of the Southern Philippines Secessionist Group in 1973. At present, it continues to operate in Western Mindanao.

The 1st Infantry Division, Philippine Army also known as Tabak Division, after years on various areas in the county, opened its present headquarters on 4 December 1989 at stationed in Camp Major Cesar L Sang-an in Barangay Pulacan, Labangan, Zamboanga Del Sur after its stint in Jolo, Sulu.  It was redeployed in mainland Zamboanga Peninsula and Lanao Provinces (ZAMPELAN) to combat the Communist and Islamic rebel fighters and to counter terrorism in Mindanao, Basilan, Sulu and Tawi-Tawi (BASULTA) and started the ongoing Islamic and Communist insurgencies in Mindanao in Southern Philippines on 1969 to date against the Communist rebels of the New People's Army (NPA) and the Islamic rebels and bandits of the Moro Islamic Liberation Front (MILF), Moro National Liberation Front (MNLF) and the Abu Sayyaf Group (ASG).

The Headquarters of the 1st Infantry (TABAK) Division is located on a  military reservation surrounding Barangay Upper Pulacan, in Labangan, Zamboanga del Sur. This reservation was taken over by the Division from Army Reserve Command (ARESCOM) on 16 August 1987. From being rugged and mountainous, it was slowly developed into a sprawling and thriving military camp with the help of the 545th Engineer Battalion, 52nd Engineering Brigade, Philippine Army.

On 4 May 1991, the Camp was named in honor of Major Cesar L. Sang-an who died defending the country's sovereignty against a superior number of MNLF forces of Barangay Malaning, Labangan, Zamboanga del Sur on 23 March 1973. Sang-an was a brilliant Scout Ranger officer and a courageous fighter. Though twice wounded, he directed and covered his men until he was killed. This heroism earned him the award of the Distinguished Conduct Star (Posthumous) from the Armed Forces of the Philippines. He was born on 3 November 1926 in Kinogitan, Misamis Oriental.

Mission

The 1st Infantry (TABAK) Division, Philippine Army to conduct reinvigorated Internal Peace and Security Operations (IPSO) in the AOR to neutralize the CTM, destroy the ASG and JI, hold and contain MILF forces while continuing to observe the primacy of the peace process and neutralize other threat groups in order to establish a physically and psychologically secured environment conducive to progress and development.

Lineage of commanding officers
 BGen Guillermo B. Francisco, PA – (5 May 1936 – 10 October 1938)
 BGen Mateo C. Capinpin, PA – (10 October 1938 – 31 August 1941)
 BGen Fidel V. Segundo, PA – (18 December 1941 – 26 January 1942)
 BGen Tirzo G. Fajardo, AFP – (1 October 1957 – 15 June 1958)
 BGen Manuel T. Flores, AFP – (15 June 1958 – 2 November 1958)
 BGen Antonio C. Deveyra, AFP – (2 November 1958 – 28 March 1962)
 BGen Ernesto M. Mata, AFP – (1 March 1962 – 17 March 1962)
 BGen Rigoberto J. Atienza, AFP – (17 September 1963 – 9 June 1964)
 BGen Flaviano P. Olivares, AFP – (10 June 1964 – 15 March 1965)
 BGen Godofredo F. Mendoza, AFP – (15 March 1965 – 1 June 1965)
 BGen Gaudencio V. Tobias, AFP – (1 June 1965 – 11 June 1966)
 BGen Romeo C. Espino, AFP – (17 June 1966 – 23 February 1967)
 BGen Ruben F. Maglaya, AFP – (23 February 1967 – 5 June 1968)
 BGen Eduardo M. Garcia, AFP – (5 June 1968 – 6 February 1970)
 BGen Rafael G. Zagala, AFP – (6 February 1970 – 31 March 1976)
 BGen Teodulfo S. Bautista, AFP – (4 March 1976 – 10 October 1977)
 BGen Emilio S. Luga, AFP – (12 October 1977 – 21 May 1981)
 BGen Angelo C. Queding, AFP – (21 May 1981 – 31 March 1982)
 BGen Mariano G. Miranda, AFP – (25 April 1982 – 25 February 1986)
 BGen Rodolfo T. Tolentino, AFP – (25 February 1986 – 1 April 1986)
 BGen Ernesto C. Maderazo, AFP – (1 April 1986 – 11 October 1987)
 BGen Raul T. Aquino, AFP – (11 October 1987 – 12 October 1987)
 BGen Buenaventura S. Tabo, AFP – (12 October 1987 – 28 March 1988)
 BGen Gumersindo T. Yap, AFP – (28 March 1988 – 1 August 1989)
 BGen Ernesto B. Calupig, AFP – (1 August 1989 – 4 December 1989)
 BGen Cesar F. Fortuno, AFP – (4 December 1989 – 2 February 1991)
 BGen Eduardo M. Fernandez, AFP – (2 February 1991 – 15 October 1991)
 BGen Raymundo T. Jarque, AFP – (15 October 1991 – 22 December 1992)
 BGen Rene G. Cardones, AFP – (22 December 1992 – 15 July 1995)
 MGen Rene J. S. Dado, AFP – (15 July 1995 – 6 October 1997)
 MGen Diomedio P. Villanueva, AFP – (6 October 1997 – 23 July 1999)
 MGen Narciso J. Abaya, AFP – (23 July 1999 – 28 March 2001)
 MGen Romeo B. Dominguez, AFP – (28 March 2001 – 7 July 2001)
 MGen Glicerio S. Sua, AFP – (8 July 2001 – 28 February 2003)
 BGen Trifonio P. Salazar, AFP – (28 February 2003 – 20 November 2004)
 BGen Gabriel A. Habacon, AFP – (20 November 2004 – 11 January 2006)
 Mgen Eugenio V. Cedo, AFP – (11 January 2006 – 1 September 2006)
 MGen Raymundo B. Ferrer, AFP – (1 September 2006 – 16 March 2007)
 MGen Nehemias G. Pajarito, AFP – (16 March 2007 – 24 February 2009)
 MGen Romeo D. Lustestica, AFP – (24 February 2009 – 13 January 2011)
 MGen Noel A. Coballes, AFP – (13 January 2011 – 10 February 2012)
 MGen Ricardo Rainier G. Cruz III, AFP – (10 February 2012 – 10 February 2013)
 BGen Daniel A. Lucero, AFP – (10 February 2013 – 2 June 2013)
 MGen Felicito Virgilio M. Trinidad Jr., AFP – (2 June 2013 – 4 June 2014)
 MGen Gerardo F. Barrientos Jr., PA – (4 June 2014 – 18 March 2017)
 MGen Rolando Joselito D. Bautista, PA – (18 March 2017 – 8 October 2017)
 MGen Roseller G. Murillo, PA – (8 October 2017 – 17 February 2019)
 MGen Roberto T Ancan, PA – (18 February 2019 – 17 January 2020)
 MGen Generoso M. Ponio, PA – (17 January 2020 – 08 July 2022)
 BGen Jose Randolf M. Sino Cruz, PA – (08 July 2022 – 11 August 2022) (acting)
 BGen Antonio G. Nafarrete, PA – (11 August 2022 – Present)

1st Regular Division (PA), 1941–42 Order of Battle
Fully-manned in the summer of 1941, and commanded by the truly formidable BGen. Mateo M. Capinpin, the 1st Regular Division of the Philippine Army completely gave its manpower in late August to help fill in the beginning ranks of the Army's ten Reserve Divisions, which were just being mobilized and manned.  From September through late November, the 1st Regular Division was, for all practical purposes, de-activated.  But its few personnel who remained—and the American and Philippine area commanders who oversaw the emergency reorganizations—were ready to implement careful plans to reassemble enough personnel to re-activate the 1st Division quickly, and then begin filling back in its ranks.  When Japanese hostilities broke out on 8 Dec 1941, the 1st Regular Division was only at cadre strength (just its commissioned and senior non-commissioned officers).  Within ten days, 18 Dec 1941, it was re-activated and inducted back into the force tabulations of BGen. George M. Parker's South Luzon Force.  Its new commanding general, the tough and brilliant West Pointer, BGen. Fidel V. Segundo (PA), set his hand to the task of continuing to bring the Division's units back up to as full a strength possible, all the while fighting a difficult staged retreat from South Luzon into the Bataan peninsula.  The following Order of Battle is from late December 1941, but was more or less what the Division structure was throughout the 1942 Bataan Campaign:

 1st Infantry Regiment (PA) (Col. Kearie L. Berry; then Col. Dennis P. Murphy, Inf.) 
 2nd Infantry Regiment (PA) (was on Mindanao in Dec 1941) 
 3rd Infantry Regiment (PA) (Col. Albert H. Dumas, Inf.; then Col. Leslie T. Lathrop, Inf.)
 1st Field Artillery Regiment (PA) 
 1st FA Regt HQ Company (PA) 
 1st Bn/1st FA Regt (PA) 
 2nd Bn/1st FA Regt (PA) 
 3rd Bn/1st FA Regt (PA)
 1st Engineer Battalion (PA) 
 1st Division Units (PA) 
 1st Division Headquarters & HQ Company (PA) 
 1st Medical Battalion (PA)
 1st Signal Company (PA) 
 1st Quartermaster Company (Motorized) (PA) 
 1st QM Transport Company (Truck) (PA)
 1st Service Company (PA)

Current units
The following are the Brigade units that are under the First Infantry Division.
 101st Infantry (Three Red Arrows) Brigade
 102nd Infantry (Igsoon) Brigade
 103rd Infantry (Haribon) Brigade
 104th Infantry (Sultan) Brigade
OPCON
 2nd Mechanized (Magbalantay) Infantry Brigade

The following are the Battalion units under the First Infantry Division.
 5th Infantry (Duty Bound) Battalion (CAFGU)
 10th Infantry (Steady...On) Battalion
 44th Infantry (Agile n Stable)Battalion 
 51st Infantry (Fuerte Uno) Battalion
 53rd Infantry (Matapát) Battalion
 55th Infantry (Vigilant) Battalion
 1st Military Intelligence Battalion
 1st Civil Military Operations Battalion
 1st Field Artillery Battalion
 1st Signal Battalion

The following are the Division Reconnaissance Company units under the First Infantry Division. 
 11th Division Reconnaissance Company Kaakibat
 12th Division Reconnaissance Company Mafuerza
 14th Division Reconnaissance Company Finders
 15th Division Reconnaissance Company Mabagsik

OPCON
 15th Infantry (Molave Warrior) Battalion, 3rd Infantry Division
 65th Infantry Battalion, 9th Infantry Division
 6th Special Forces Battalion, Special Forces Regiment (Airborne), Special Operations Command
 4th Scout Ranger Battalion, First Scout Ranger Regiment, Special Operations Command
 4th Mechanized Infantry Battalion
 1st Cavalry Squadron
 3rd Cavalry Squadron

Operations
 Anti-guerrilla operations against the New People's Army and the Moro National Liberation Front (MNLF). After a treaty was concluded between Philippine and MNLF officials, the 1ID fought against the Moro Islamic Liberation Front (MILF).
 Anti-terrorist operations against the Abu Sayyaf.
 Battle of Marawi in 2017

References

External links
 Official website

Infantry divisions of the Philippines
Philippine Army
Military units and formations established in 1936
Military units and formations reestablished in 1942
Military units and formations of the Philippine Army in World War II